Pittalavanipalem is a village in Bapatla district of the Indian state of Andhra Pradesh. It is located in Pittalavanipalem mandal of Guntur revenue division. The village is dependent on agriculture, with the Kommamuru and Poondla channels of the Krishna Western Delta system providing water for irrigation.

Government and politics 

Pittalavanipalem gram panchayat is the local self-government of the village. It is divided into wards and each ward is represented by a ward member. The ward members are headed by a Sarpanch.

Education 

As per the school information report for the academic year 2018–19, the village has a total of 20 schools. These include one government school, 15 Zilla Parishad/Mandal Parishad and 4 private schools.

See also 
List of villages in Guntur district

References 

Villages in Guntur district
Mandal headquarters in Guntur district